Bay Trail or Bayside Trail may refer to:

 Bay Trail (Australia), a trail in Victoria, Australia
 San Francisco Bay Trail, a trail in California, United States
 Bay Trail (system on chip), a computer chip platform by Intel
 Bayside Trail, a trail in Cabrillo National Monument, California, United States